The fourth encirclement campaign against the Hubei–Henan–Anhui Soviet was an encirclement campaign launched by the Chinese Nationalist Government that was intended to destroy the communist Hubei–Henan–Anhui Soviet and its Chinese Red Army in the local region.  It was responded by the Communists' fourth counter-encirclement campaign at Hubei–Henan–Anhui Soviet, also called by the communists as the fourth counter-encirclement campaign at Hubei–Henan–Anhui Revolutionary Base, in which the local nationalist force defeated the local Chinese Red Army and overran their soviet republic in the border region of Hubei, Henan, and Anhui provinces from early July 1932 to 12 October 1932.  However, the Nationalist victory was incomplete because they had concluded the campaign too early in their jubilation, resulting in the bulk of the communist force escaped and established another communist base in the border region of Sichuan and Shaanxi provinces.  Moreover, the remnant local communist force of the Hubei–Henan–Anhui Soviet had also rebuilt the local Soviet republic by taking advantage of the early nationalist withdrawal, and as a result, nationalists had to launch another encirclement campaign later to repeat the effort again.

See also
List of battles of the Chinese Civil War
National Revolutionary Army
People's Liberation Army
History of the People's Liberation Army
Chinese Civil War

References
Military History Research Department, Complete History of the People's Liberation Army, Military Science Publishing House in Beijing, 2000, 

Campaigns of the Chinese Civil War
1932 in China

zh:豫鄂皖邊區第四次圍剿